Lourens van der Merwe is a rugby referee on the TMO Panel of the South African Rugby Union.

References
 

Living people
South African rugby union referees
Super Rugby referees
Year of birth missing (living people)